The Montview Boulevard Presbyterian Church is a historic church at 1980 Dahlia Street, on the corner of Montview Boulevard, in Denver, Colorado.  It was built in 1910 and was added to the National Register in 2004.

It was built as a tiny chapel in Richardsonian Romanesque style in 1910 and expanded, also in Richardsonian Romanesque style, in 1918, with the expansion designed by architects Frank W. Frewan and Harry J. Manning.  An education wing was added in 1926, also in Richardsonian Romanesque style, designed by Hoyt and Hoyt.  It was further expanded in 1958 in Gothic Revival style.

References

Presbyterian churches in Colorado
Churches on the National Register of Historic Places in Colorado
Gothic Revival church buildings in Colorado
Romanesque Revival church buildings in Colorado
Churches completed in 1910
National Register of Historic Places in Denver